Falsitromina is a genus of sea snails, marine gastropod mollusks in the family Cominellidae.

Species
Species within the genus Falsitromina include:

 Falsitromina bella (Powell, 1951)
 Falsitromina fenestrata (Powell, 1951)
 Falsitromina powelli Dell, 1990
 Falsitromina simplex (Powell, 1951)
 Falsitromina tricarinata (Powell, 1951)

References

 Dell, R. K. (1990). Antarctic Mollusca with special reference to the fauna of the Ross Sea. Bulletin of the Royal Society of New Zealand, Wellington 27: 1–311

Cominellidae